State Road 37 (SR 37) is a state highway in Manatee and Polk counties in Florida, United States, that also passes through the very extreme southeast corner of  Hillsborough. It connects Florida State Road 62 (SR 62) in Duette, Florida with Florida State Road 35 / Florida State Road 600 (Main Street) in Lakeland. It is signed as Church Avenue in Mulberry and South Florida Avenue in Lakeland.



Route description
From its southern terminus at SR 62 in the tiny town of Duette in Manatee County, it travels in a northeastern direction, briefly entering the "Four Corners" section of Hillsborough County before entering Polk County. For most of its length south of Florida State Road 60 (SR 60) in Mulberry, SR 37 is a lonely stretch of road with oak hammocks and occasional phosphate mines.  From SR 60 to its northern terminus at West Main Street in Lakeland, it serves as the north/south dividing line of the street grids of both Mulberry and Lakeland.

History
The road was originally built to provide easy access between Bradenton (via SR 62) and Lakeland, although it was mostly bypassed after the construction of the faster I-4 and I-75.

Major intersections

See also

 List of state highways in Florida
 List of highways numbered 37

References

External links

037
037
037
037